Hugh Jackson Morris (22 January 1932 – 10 November 2013) was an Australian rules footballer who played with Essendon and St Kilda in the Victorian Football League (VFL). He was a premiership player with Essendon's reserves in 1952. Morris also played for Warracknabeal and Port Melbourne.

Morris initially worked as a police officer before founding his own security company.

Notes

External links 

Hugh Morris's playing statistics from The VFA Project
Essendon Football Club past player profile

1932 births
2013 deaths
Australian rules footballers from Victoria (Australia)
Essendon Football Club players
St Kilda Football Club players
Warracknabeal Football Club players
Port Melbourne Football Club players